This is an alphabetical index of topics related to Asian Americans.

0-9
49-Mile Scenic Drive
80-20 Initiative
99 Ranch Market
100th Infantry Battalion
442nd Regimental Combat Team

A
A Magazine
Aim High Academy
Adopt-An-Alleyway Youth Empowerment Project
Affirmative action
Ah Ken
Alien land laws
Allen Street
Amerasian
American Chinese cuisine
American television series with Asian leads
Angel Island
Asian American
Asian American activism
Asian American and Pacific Islander Policy Research Consortium
Asian American Arts Centre
Asian American Curriculum Project
Asian American Dance Theatre
Asian American International Film Festival
Asian American jazz
Asian American Journalists Association
Asian American Legal Defense and Education Fund
Asian American Literary Review
Asian American literature
Asian American Literature Festival
Asian American movement
Asian American Political Alliance
Asian American public television
Asian American Student Union
Asian American Studies
Asian American theatre
Asian American Women Artists Association
Asian American Writers' Workshop
Asian Americans (documentary series)
Asian Americans in arts and entertainment
Asian Americans in Houston
Asian Americans in New York City
Asian Americans in politics
Asian Americans in science and technology
Asian Americans in sports
Asian fetish
Asian immigration to the United States
Asian Latino
Asian Pacific American
Asian/Pacific American Awards for Literature
Asian Pacific American Heritage Festival
Asian Pacific American Heritage Month
Asian Pacific Thematic Historic District
Asian pride
Asian quota in higher education admissions
Asian Week
Asians in Rock
Asiatic Exclusion League
AZN Television

B
Bamboo ceiling

C
California Street (San Francisco)
Donaldina Cameron
Cathay Bank
Cathedral High School (Los Angeles)
Cayetano Apablasa
Cedar Grove OnStage
Cedar Grove Productions
Center for Asian American Media
Chan Is Missing
Chin, Vincent
Chinatown
Chinatown (1974 film)
Chinatown Family
Chinatown, Honolulu
Chinatown Kid
Chinatown, Los Angeles
Chinatown (Los Angeles Metro station)
Chinese American
Chinese American Museum
Chinese American Citizens Alliance
Chinese-American Planning Council
Chinese Cemetery of Los Angeles
Chinese Consolidated Benevolent Association
Chinese Consulate-General, Los Angeles
Chinese Culture Center
Chinese Historical Society of America
Chinese Historical Society of Southern California
Chinese Exclusion Act
Chinese Immersion School at De Avila
Chinese for Affirmative Action
Chinese Massacre of 1871
Chinese school
Ching Chong
Chung Ching Yee
Chung King Road
City College of San Francisco
Clement Street Chinatown, San Francisco
Columbus Avenue (San Francisco)
Commercial Street, San Francisco
Congressional Asian Pacific American Caucus
Coolie

D
Demographics of Asian Americans
Desi
Deportation of Cambodian Americans
Dev Bootcamp
Dim Sum: A Little Bit of Heart
Division Street (Manhattan)
Donald Duk
Downtown Magnets High School
Doyers Street

E
East–West Center
East West Players
The Eighth Promise
Eng Suey Sun Association

F
FilCom Center
Filipino American History Month
Filipino American Friendship Day
First transcontinental railroad
Flip
Forbidden City (nightclub)
Flower Drum Song
Flower Drum Song (film)
The Flower Drum Song
Fresh off the boat

G
Geary Act
Gentlemen's Agreement
Gin Family Association
Golden Dragon massacre
Golden Gate Fortune Cookie Company
Got Rice?
Grant Avenue

H
Hapa
Hawaii Hochi
Hawaii Kotohira Jinsha – Hawaii Dazaifu Tenmangu
Hawaii Shingon Mission
Health status of Asian Americans
Historic Filipinotown, Los Angeles, California
History of Asian Americans
History of the Chinese Americans in Los Angeles
History of the Koreans in Baltimore
James Hong
You Chung Hong
Hong Fook Tong Chinese Dramatic Company

I
Immigration Act of 1917
Immigration Act of 1924
Import scene
International Examiner
International Hotel (San Francisco)
Irving Street Chinatown, San Francisco
Izumo Taishakyo Mission of Hawaii

J
Jack Kerouac Alley
Jackson Street Boys
Jade Ribbon Campaign
Japanese American
Japanese American Citizens League
Japanese American internment
Japanese American National Museum
Japantown
Jian Li
Joe's Shanghai
Jook sing
The Joy Luck Club (novel)
Judges

K
KAHZ
KAZN
KHCM (AM)
KHRA
Kearny Street
Killing of Vincent Chin
Kong Chow Temple
Korean adoptee
Korean American
Korean school
Koreatown
KPHI
KREA
Kung Phooey
Kyoto Gardens of Honolulu Memorial Park
KZOO
 Korean National Association

L
List of Asian-American firsts
List of Asian Americans
List of Asian Academy Award winners and nominees
List of Asian American jurists
List of Asian American theatre companies
List of Asian American writers
List of Asian Tony Award winners and nominees
List of U.S. communities with Asian-American majority populations
List of documentary films about the Japanese American internment
List of streets and alleys in Chinatown, San Francisco
Little Manila
Little Saigon
Los Angeles Asian Pacific Film Festival

M
Magnuson Act
Making Tracks Asian American historical musical
Miguel Contreras Learning Complex
Military history of Asian Americans
MinKwon Center for Community Action
Miss Asian America
Model minority
Mott Street
MTV Chi
MTV Desi
MTV K
Museum of Chinese in America

N
Narasaki, Karen
New York Filipino Film Festival
Haing S. Ngor
Nisei Baseball Research Project
No-No Boy
Noriega Street Chinatown, San Francisco
Northwest Asian Weekly
Nyotaimori

O
Old Saint Mary's Cathedral
Organization of Chinese Americans

P
Pacific Buddhist Academy
Philippe's
Philippine Independence Day Parade
Portsmouth Square
Portrayal of East Asians in American film and theater
Powell Street (San Francisco)
Preferred Bank

R
Racist love
Ross Alley

S
San Francisco Chinatown: A Guide to Its History & Architecture
San Francisco Chinese Hospital
San Francisco Chinese New Year Festival and Parade
San Francisco plague of 1900–04
San Francisco Riot of 1877
SARS and accusations of racial discrimination
Sam Wo
Sam Woo Restaurant
Seattle Asian American Film Festival
Lisa See
Secret Asian Man
Sex crimes against Asian women in the United States
Shadows Over Chinatown
Shuang Wen Academy Network
Silk Road Rising
The Slanted Screen
South Asian Americans
Stereotypes of Asians (disambiguation)
Stereotypes of East Asians in the United States
St. Hedwig's Church (Chicago)
Stockton Street (San Francisco)
Stockton Street Tunnel
Stop AAPI Hate
Stop Asian Hate
St. Wenceslaus Church, Chicago
Sodhi, Balbir Singh

T
Taiwanese American
Takao Ozawa v. United States
Thien Hau Temple, Los Angeles
Ah Toy
Church of the Transfiguration, Roman Catholic (Manhattan)
 The New Korea

U
USA for Indonesia
United Chinese Society

V
VC FilmFest
Visual Communications (VC)

W
Wah Ching
Wen Ho Lee
Otto G. Weyse
Willie "Woo Woo" Wong
Wing Luke Asian Museum
Workingman's Party
Tyrus Wong

X
Xenophobia and racism related to the COVID-19 pandemic

Y
The Year of the Dragon (play)
Yellow Peril
Yellowface
Yellowworld
Yick Wo v. Hopkins

Asian American
 
 
Asian American
Asian-American society